Mesonauta insignis is a species of cichlid fish native to the Orinoco and upper Rio Negro basins in South America.

References 

insignis
Freshwater fish of Brazil
Freshwater fish of Colombia
Fish of Venezuela
Fish described in 1840